Cantamos is the seventh studio album by the country rock band Poco. It was released in 1974 on Epic Records. This album saw the band moving back towards their traditional country rock sound after experimenting with a harder style on the previous album.

Release history
In addition to the conventional 2 channel stereo version the album was also released in a 4 channel quadraphonic edition on LP on 8-track tape in 1974. The quad LP release was encoded with the SQ matrix system.

The album was reissued in the UK on the Super Audio CD format in 2018 by Dutton Vocalion. This edition is a 2 albums on 1 disc compilation which also contains the 1974 Poco album Seven. The Dutton Vocalion release contains the complete stereo and quad mixes of both albums.

Reception

In his Allmusic review, music critic James Chrispell wrote of the album "Much of the magic of their earlier albums has been recaptured."

Track listing
"Sagebrush Serenade" (Rusty Young) – 4:58
"Susannah" (Paul Cotton) – 4:13
"High and Dry" (Young) – 4:49
"Western Waterloo'" (Cotton) – 4:00
"One Horse Blue" (Cotton) – 3:34
"Bitter Blue" (Timothy B. Schmit) – 3:20
"Another Time Around" (Cotton) – 5:01
"Whatever Happened to Your Smile" (Schmit) – 3:14
"All The Ways" (Young) – 3:28

Personnel 
 Paul Cotton – guitars, vocals
 Rusty Young – steel guitar, banjo, guitars, vocals
 Timothy B. Schmit – bass, vocals
 George Grantham – drums, vocals

Production 
 Poco – producers
 Mark Henry Harman – engineer 
 Michael Verdick – assistant engineer 
 Wally Traugott – mastering 
 Phil Hartman – cover design, illustration
 Gribbitt! – creative direction 
 Hartmann and Goodman – management

Studios
 Recorded and Mixed at Record Plant (Los Angeles, California).
 Mastered at Capitol Studios (Hollywood, California).

References

Poco albums
1974 albums
Epic Records albums